Sipiwesk Lake is a large lake in the province of Manitoba in Canada north of Lake Winnipeg. The lake is a part of the Nelson River watershed and is located north of Cross Lake.  
The lake is about  78 km (48 miles) long.

The Nelson River flows north from Cross Lake and enters the south end of Sipiwesk Lake on each side of Bear Island flowing through Duck Lake located west of Bear Island. The Nelson River then flows out from the east end of Sipiwesk Lake.

See also
List of lakes of Manitoba

References 

Lakes of Manitoba